Faye is a given name in various cultures. In the West, the given name is usually feminine. Faye is derived from Middle English "faie", meaning "fairy", or possibly from the Old French word meaning loyalty or belief.

People
 Faye Glenn Abdellah (1919–2017), American pioneer in nursing research, first woman Deputy Surgeon General and rear admiral
 Faye Adams, stage name of American R&B singer Fanny Tuell (born 1923)
 Faye Brookes (born 1987), English actress
 Faye Blackstone (1915–2011), American rodeo star
 Faye Copeland (1921–2003), American convicted multiple murderer
 Faye Daveney (born 1993), British actress
 Faye D'Souza, Indian TV anchor
 Faye Dunaway (born 1941), American actress
 Faye Emerson (1917–1983), American actress
 Faye Grant (born 1957), American actress
 Faye Kellerman (born 1952), American writer of mystery novels  
 Faye Marsay (born 1986), English actress
 Faye Resnick (born 1959), American actress
 Faye Tozer (born 1975), British singer who found fame in UK pop band Steps
 Faye Urban (1945–2020), Canadian tennis player
 Faye Wattleton (born 1943), American activist for women's rights
 Faye Webster (born 1997), American indie folk musician, singer, and photographer
 Faye White (born 1978), English former footballer
 Faye Winter (born 1995), English television personality
 Faye Wong (born 1969), Chinese singer, songwriter and actress

Fictional characters
 Faye Chamberlain in the TV series The Secret Circle (TV series)
 Faye Dolan in the film That Thing You Do!
 Faye Lamb in the British soap opera Emmerdale
 Dr. Faye Miller in the TV show Mad Men
 Faye Morton in the British TV series Holby City
 Faye Moskowitz, Frasier Crane's recurring love interest in Frasier season 6
 Faye Valentine in the anime Cowboy Bebop
 Faye Whitaker in the webcomic Questionable Content
 Faye Windass (née Butler) in the UK TV series Coronation Street
 Faye in the video game Fire Emblem Echoes: Shadows of Valentia, and mobile game Fire Emblem Heroes
 Faye in Freebird Games' video game "Finding Paradise"
 Faye, a character in video game franchise God of War
 Faye, the protagonist in Rachel Cusk's Outline novels

See also
Fay (given name)
Faye (surname)
Faye (disambiguation)

References

English feminine given names